The Malahat station is located in Malahat, British Columbia. The station was a flag stop on Via Rail's Dayliner service, which has been indefinitely suspended since 2011.

References 

Via Rail stations in British Columbia
Disused railway stations in Canada